"The Last Resort" is a song co-written and recorded by American country music artist T. Graham Brown.  It was released in January 1988 as the third single from the album Brilliant Conversationalist.  It reached number 4 on the Billboard Hot Country Singles & Tracks chart.  The song was written by Brown, Bruce Burch, and Bruce Bouton.

Charts

Weekly charts

Year-end charts

References

1988 singles
1987 songs
T. Graham Brown songs
Capitol Records Nashville singles
Songs written by Bruce Burch
Songs written by T. Graham Brown